Chinna Thayee is a 1992 Indian Tamil-language drama film directed by S. Ganesaraj. The film stars Vignesh and Padmashri. It was released on 1 February 1992.

Plot

Ponrasu returns to his village after studying in the city. Ponrasu's father Veeramuthu Naicker is the religious figure of the village called "Samiyaadi" (disguised as the male deity Sudalai Madan) who delivers divine judgement and kills those who faced him during the ceremony. Ponrasu loves the village belle Chinna Thayee since his childhood and Chinna Thayee develops a soft corner for Ponrasu.

Chinna Thayee's mother Raasamma is against their love because in the past Raasamma was in love with a singer and he dumped her after consummating their relationship. She is afraid that the same thing happens to her daughter. Raasamma is the mistress of Samundi, a brute, who is married to another person and has a child.

Raasamma brainwashed Chinna Thayee and convinced her to forget him. Chinna Thayee first avoids Ponrasu, but then they get closer and Chinna Thayee gets pregnant. In a routine ceremony, Veeramuthu Naicker as "Samiyaadi" faces Raasamma who reveals everything on their children's relationship and she implores him to kill her. Shocked, Veeramuthu Naicker ignores her. This incident is considered a bad omen by the villagers. Then, Ponrasu's parents brainwash him and the heartbroken Ponrasu returns to the city.

One day, Samundi tries to rape Chinna Thayee and during the confrontation, he kills his mistress Raasamma. At the village court (Gram panchayat), Veeramuthu Naicker solely orders Samundi to make offerings at the temple and he succeeds to cover up his son's love affair. Chinna Thayee complains it to the police and the police inspector Sankarapandian attempts to arrest Samundi. Sankarapandian faces the village's opposition, so he arrests Veeramuthu Naicker and he releases him later. Ponrasu returns to his village and he cannot forget Chinna Thayee whereas his father forces him to marry with another girl. The previous ceremony's incident overwhelmed the entire village, so Ponrasu becomes the new "Samiyaadi". During the ceremony, Ponrasu faces Chinna Thayee with his newborn baby. What transpires later forms the crux of the story.

Cast

Vignesh as Ponrasu
Padmashri as Chinna Thayee (Rajeswari in porkalam)
Radha Ravi as Inspector Sankarapandian
Vinu Chakravarthy as Veeramuthu Naicker
Napoleon as Samundi
Goundamani
Senthil
Sabitha Anand as Raasamma
Vaani
Surya
Vasuki
G. Jayanthi
Vichithra as Ponnamma
Junior Balaiah as Vathiyar
A. K. Veerasamy
Krishnamoorthy

Soundtrack
The music was composed by Ilaiyaraaja, with lyrics written by Vaali.

Reception
N. Krishnaswamy of The New Indian Express gave the film a positive review citing "director Ganesharaj comes up with winning scenes that have elemental power, making his artistes with one another, and the audience well". He also praised the cinematographer Viswam Nataraj and the music director Ilaiyaraaja for their work. The film completed a 100-day run at the box-office.

References

External links
 

1992 films
Films scored by Ilaiyaraaja
1990s Tamil-language films